Hatzichristos is a type of a Greek folk dance from Central Greece.

See also
Music of Greece
Greek dances

Greek dances
Greek music